Long Walk to Forever is an American 1987 drama short film, shot in Clayton, Georgia, and is also one of Denis Leary's early appearances.

Plot 
When he hears that the girl next door is getting married, Newt goes AWOL from the Army and hitch-hikes home to convince her to marry him.

External links 

1987 drama films
1987 short films
1987 films
American drama short films
Films set in Georgia (U.S. state)
1980s English-language films
1980s American films